ISO 31-4 is the part of international standard ISO 31 that defines names and symbols for quantities and units related to heat. It is superseded by ISO 80000-5.

Its definitions include:

Annex A of ISO 31-4 lists units of heat based on the foot, pound and second and some other units, including the degree Rankine, degree Fahrenheit, British thermal unit and others. Annex B lists conversion factors for three versions of the calorie.

00031-4